Seleshi Bekele was born in west shew, Oromia and an Ethiopian politician and academic who served as the Chief Negotiator & Advisor on Transboundary Rivers and GERD at Office of Prime Minister of Ethiopia. Prior to this position, He served as the Minister of Water, Irrigation and Energy of Ethiopia.

Education
He has obtained his bachelor's degree in Civil Engineering from Addis Ababa University in 1987. He also obtained Masters of Science in Hydraulic Engineer in 1992 from Newcastle University and Ph.D. from Technical University of Dresden in Hydraulic and Water Resources Engineering in 2001.

Career
Seleshi is known for actively participating in the tri-lateral negotiations with Sudan and Egypt in regards to the Grand Ethiopian Renaissance Dam (GERD). In this regards, he is the first Minister of Water to appear before the U.N. Security Council representing Ethiopia's Standpoint about GERD.

References

Ethiopian political people
Living people
21st-century Ethiopian politicians
Addis Ababa University alumni
Government ministers of Ethiopia
Year of birth missing (living people)
Alumni of Newcastle University
TU Dresden alumni